Intel Extreme Masters Fall 2021 Europe (IEM Fall 2021 EU) was a Counter-Strike: Global Offensive (CSGO) tournament organized by German company ESL and sponsored by American corporation Intel. Part of the sixteenth season of Intel Extreme Masters and one of the six events under the IEM Fall 2021 tournament, the event was used by Valve as the final Regional Major Ranking (RMR) event, to determine the participants of the PGL Major Stockholm 2021. Twenty-four teams competed for a  prize pool, eleven spots at the major and for 2015 ESL Pro Tour Points, used by the organizer to determine the participants of its two main events each year—IEM Katowice and Cologne.

The event was preceded by four qualifier events starting on August 28, which culminated in the Closed qualifier on September 18, determining the final twelve participants for event. The event started on September 29, with the group stage, where the teams were split equal between four groups. The two best performing teams of each group advanced to the quarterfinals. The final saw Swedish team Ninjas in Pyjamas (NIP) overpower European squad ENCE, 3–1. NIP's Nicolai "dev1ce" Reedtz, was named the MVP by both HLTV and ESL.

Background
Intel Extreme Masters Fall 2021 was a series of six individual tournaments, held in six regions of the world—Asia, the CIS (Commonwealth of Independent States), Europe, North America, Oceania, South America. The European imprint of the tournament was held between September 29 and October 10, 2021, on LAN in Stockholm, Sweden. It was the third and final Valve-sanctioned event of the year, to determine the participants of the sixteenth CSGO Major Championships, the PGL Major Stockholm 2021 and the first since the Berlin major in September 2019, due to the COVID-19 pandemic.

Eight days prior, Valve released CSGO's eleventh Operation, Riptide, alongside two gameplay changes. Firstly, they blocked the visibility at the middle position on the map Dust 2 and made grenades dropable, a feature previously only available to all guns in the game. Due to the nature of IEM Fall 2021 being a Valve sanctioned event, it had to be played on the new patch including these changes.

Broadcast talent
Desk hosts
 Tres "stunna" Saranthus
Analyst
 Adam "Dinko" Hawthorne
 Janko "YNk" Paunović
Commentators
 Alex "Machine" Richardson
 Chad "SPUNJ" Burchill
Interviewer
 Pala Gilroy Sen
Observers
 Alexander "Rushly" Rush
 Bastian "UnknownFME" Faber
 Jake "Jak3y" Elton
 Ryan "ItsRandall" Randall
 Michael "MC" Campagna

Qualifiers

Intel Extreme Masters Fall 2021 Europe was preceded by four, open qualifier events, in which two teams each could advance to the closed qualifier, to determine the events finals twelve teams. The winners of the semi-finals, would advance to the closed qualifier. The first qualifier was held between August 28 and 29 and was won by European squad MAD Lions who overtook Polish team AVEZ 2-0 (16-12; 16-8) and Bulgarian team Fiend, which won against French LDLC 2–1, (16-7; 12–16; 16-6). In the second open qualifier, the Copenhagen Flames overtook Wisla Krakow 2-0 (16-11; 16–12), with Movistar Riders advancing, over cowana with a 2-0 (16-11; 16–12).

For the third open qualifier, more than "190 teams [have] signed up". Following three brackets, starting with a round of 64, sixteen teams again qualified, including LDLC and cowana, who previously failed in qualifier two. British team Endpoint won against Polish AVEZ, with a 2-0 (19-15; 16–7) and LDLC again could not make the cut, as they lost 2-0 (6-16; 13–16) to Swedish team AURA. The fourth and final open qualifier had more than 250 teams sign up and started with a round of 256, where more popular teams directly advanced to the round of 128. Portuguese SAW overtook Danish AaB 2-0 (16-10; 16–12). Danish OPPA narrowly won against Finish HAVU in a 2–1, with the final map Inferno going to overtime; (16-14; 2–16; 22–20).

Through hundreds of teams, eight teams qualified for the closed and final qualifier for the event. The event started with a round of 16, where the winners of the individual matches would be qualified for IEM Fall 2021 Europe. The eight losing teams had to face each other in four more matches—Fiend, MAD Lions, fnatic and AURA, were the last teams to qualify.

Competing teams

Invited
 Ninjas in Pyjamas
 Astralis
 Heroic
 OG
 mousesports
 Complexity Gaming
 DBL Poney
 FunPlus Phoenix
 Sprout
 G2 Esports
 BIG
 Team Vitality

Qualified
 AURA
 Copenhagen Flames
 Dignitas
 ENCE
 Endpoint
 Faze Clan
 Fiend
 fnatic
 MAD Lions
 Movistar Riders
 Sinners
 Skade

Group stage

9th-12th place decider

Bracket

Playoffs

Bracket

Finals summary

The final of IEM Fall 2021 Europe started on October 10, 17:00 CET between Ninjas in Pyjamas and ENCE. NIP were already qualified as a legend for the major, while ENCE already accumulated enough points to start in the challengers category. The final was the sole match of the tournament to be played as a best of five. Due to the map pool being seven maps, the teams had to play most of the maps. NIP banned Vertigo, while ENCE did not want to play Inferno. NIP picked Overpass and Ancient, while ENCE chose Mirage and Nuke. Dust 2 was left over.

ENCE started map one, Overpass, strong with a win of the pistol round. NIP fought right back, killing their enemies for the next three rounds and the bomb exploding once. NIP closed out the first half with a 10–5. The second half started strong for ENCE who were able to eliminate the enemy team in the first three rounds. However, in round nineteen, NIP were able to turn the match around dominating ENCE for six consecutive weeks, winning the match 16–8. NIP's dev1ce lead all players with 26 kills, with ENCE's Spinx made 20 kills. On ENCE's first map pick Mirage, NIP heavily struggled against them. In the first half, NIP were only able to convert four rounds. The second started better for NIP winning the pistol and the following two rounds, but ENCE were able to win every round starting in round 19, ultimately ending the map with a 16–7 scoreline. The only member to have an above average HLTV rating was hampus with 1.25, while the entire ENCE squad had a rating above hampus'.

NIP went into their second map Ancient as the favorites, based on the teams performance on the map in EPL XIV and IEM Fall. The Ninjas won the first pistol round and the following two rounds, but ENCE were able to convert the first proper gun round to five consecutive wins, bringing the scoreline to 5–3. The remainder of the first half saw a back and forth, with the final score at half time being 8 to 7 for ENCE. With the win of the pistol round, ENCE used its momentum winning the first five rounds of half two. Through a win in round 21, NIP were able to pick up the pace evening bringing the scoreline to a 15–13. ENCE were able to convert the following round, but succumb to NIP in round thirty. On the fourth and final map Nuke, NIP went up to an incredible start, winning 11 out of the first four rounds. The second half started good for ENCE. While they lost the pistol round, they were able to convert a force buy in round 17 to another win the following round, bringing the score line to 6–12. NIP followed with pistol only eco round win and following round 19, ENCE looked overwhelmed and were not able to convert a single round in their favor again. NIP won Nuke 16–6, winning the series 3–1 over ENCE. Over the four map series, dev1ce achieved the most kills and had the highest HLTV rating, with 1.36.

Post event
For winning IEM Fall 2021 Europe, Ninjas in Pyjamas received  (26,1 %) of the prize pool. Through their performance, NIP received 2500 RMR points, for a total of 3988 points, making them Europe's best-performing team. NIP were also awarded with 500 EPT points, placing them eighth on the leaderboard for IEM Katowice 2022, with 1960 points NIP's AWPer Nicolai 'dev1ce' Reedtz was awarded the most valuable player (MVP) for the tournament, both by HLTV and ESL, his first since joining the Swedish squad in April 2021. For dev1ce it was the 29th major trophy, while REZ received his second one. For LNZ, Plopski and hampus it was the first one. NIP received one of the three Legends spot at the major; the other two were won by Vitality and G2.

Movistar Riders became the first Spanish squad to qualify for a CSGO major. On October 9, fnatic benched it's AWPer Jack 'JackinhO' Ström Mattsson, citing poor results in the last months. fnatic enlisted Owen '⁠smooya⁠' Butterfield from Movistar Riders, before announcing his signing on October 15. On October 11, FunPlus Phoenix announced that Hunter 'Lucid' Tucker had left the organization, due to "time zone difference with the team, with the hours affecting his mental health and sleep schedule." According to eSports Charts, the tournament had an average viewership per series of 115,000.

Final standings

References

2021 in esports
Intel Extreme Masters